In The Cold Wind We Smile is the debut album from Scottish band The Xcerts which was released 30 March 2009.

Overview
In The Cold Wind We Smile is the product of years of touring and hard work by The Xcerts. The album was produced by Dave Eringa who had worked with the band on the single "Do You Feel Safe'", and has been described by the band as being created through "personal tragedy".

Track listing
All songs written by The Xcerts

 "In The Cold Wind We Smile" - 0:58
 "Home Versus Home" - 4:08
 "Nightschool" - 2:51
 "Cool Ethan" - 5:16
 "Lost But Not Alone" - 3:31
 "Listen. Don't Panic" - 2:49
 "Crisis In the Slow Lane" - 4:21
 "Do You Feel Safe?" - 3:30
 "Just Go Home" - 3:28
 "Aberdeen 1987" - 4:09
 "I See Things Differently" - 4:21
 "Untitled" - 2:01
 "Growing Old" (iTunes Exclusive) - 3:02

Personnel
 Murray Macleod – guitar, vocals
 Jordan Smith – bass guitar, vocals, piano
 Tom Heron – drums, percussion, vocals
 Dave Eringa – producer, mixing, piano, organ, theremin
 Duncan Ladkin - phonecall on 'Aberdeen 1987'
 Adam Whittaker - producer and mixing on 'Just Go Home'
 Sandy Buglass - producer 'Aberdeen 1987'
 Ed Woods - mastering

References

2009 debut albums
The Xcerts albums
Xtra Mile Recordings albums
Albums produced by Dave Eringa